Brain cactus may refer to:

 Stenocactus multicostatus, a cactus native to Mexico 
 Mammillaria elongata cultivar Cristata